Swar  also Hswar is the capital city of Myanmar's Bago Region and located at  Taungoo District, Yedashe Township.

History

The city of Swar was formerly known as the Kanbar Myint village.

References

Taungoo District
Populated places in Myanmar